Lester Bookbinder (New York City, 1929 - London, 9 January 2017) was an American photographer and commercial director who worked in the United Kingdom.

Bookbinder trained with Rouben Samberg before moving to London. He established a career as a prominent fine art and studio advertising photographer, best-known for complicated compositions and studio effect shots. He also directed advertisements and the music videos for songs including Romeo and Juliet by Dire Straits.

References

2017 deaths
1929 births
American emigrants to the United Kingdom
20th-century American photographers